Robert Downey (born 1999) is an Irish hurler who plays as a full- back and half back for club side Glen Rovers and at inter-county level with the Cork senior hurling team. He usually lines out as a left wing-back.

Playing career

Christian Brothers College

During his secondary schooling at Christian Brothers College, Downey was a regular with the senior team that played in the Dr. Harty Cup.

University College Cork

After lining out for the University College Cork freshers' team in his first year at university, Downey was added to the senior team in advance of the 2020 Fitzgibbon Cup. On 12 February 2020, he won a Fitzgibbon Cup medal after lining out at full-back in UCC's 0-18 to 2-11 defeat of the Institute of Technology, Carlow in the final.

Glen Rovers

Downey joined the Glen Rovers club at a young age and played in all grades at juvenile and underage levels. On 11 September 2017, he was at centre-back when Glen Rovers defeated Midleton to win the Premier County Minor Championship final.

Downey was still eligible for the minor grade when he joined the Glen Rovers senior team. On 9 October 2016, he was an unused substitute when Glen Rovers won the Cork Senior Championship after a 0-19 to 2-10 defeat of Erin's Own in the final.

On 20 October 2019, Downey played in his second final when Glen Rovers faced Imokilly. Lining out at right wing-back, he ended the game on the losing side following a 2-17 to 1-16 defeat.

Cork

Minor and under-20

Downey first played for Cork as a member of the minor team and made his first appearance as a full-forward on 3 May 2017 in Cork's 1-24 to 0-08 defeat of Waterford. On 9 July, he scored 1-02 when Cork defeated Clare by 4-21 to 0-16 to win the Munster Championship for the first time since 2008. On 3 September, Downey was at full-forward when Cork faced Galway in the All-Ireland final. He scored a point from play, however, Cork were defeated by 2-17 to 2-15.

On 3 July 2019, Downey made his first appearance for Cork's inaugural under-20 team when he lined out at left wing-back in the 1-20 to 0-16 defeat of Limerick. On 23 July 2019, he was switched to right wing-back when Cork suffered a 3-15 to 2-17 defeat by Tipperary in the Munster final. He was selected at left wing-back when Cork faced Tipperary for a second time in the All-Ireland final on 24 August 2019. Downey scored a point from play but ended the game on the losing side after a 5-17 to 1-18 defeat.

Senior

Downey made his first appearance for the Cork senior hurling team on 29 December 2018. He lined out at left wing-back in Cork's 1-20 to 0-21 defeat by Clare in the pre-season Munster League. On 24 February 2019, he made his first appearance in the National Hurling League in a 2-21 to 1-21 defeat of Limerick. Downey made his first appearance in the Munster Championship when he lined out at right wing-back in Cork's 1-26 to 1-19 defeat of Limerick on 19 May.

Career statistics

Club

Inter-county

Minor

Senior

Honours

University College Cork
Fitzgibbon Cup (1): 2020

Glen Rovers
Cork Senior Hurling Championship (1): 2016

Cork
Munster Minor Hurling Championship (1): 2017

References

1999 births
Living people
UCC hurlers
Glen Rovers hurlers
St Nicholas' Gaelic footballers
Cork inter-county hurlers
Hurling backs